Billy the Cat is the title of a Franco-Belgian comic by the Belgian Stéphane Colman and Stephen Desberg, as well as an animated cartoon adaptation, amongst others. Both comic and cartoon deal with the everyday and secret lives of urban animals, although they take very different approaches to it, and while the characters are largely the same in both versions, the stories and situations are very different.

The comic debuted in 1981.

Comic series
Billy starts out as a normal human schoolboy who delights in mean-spirited pranks and often bullies animals. However, early in the first comic album, he is killed when he carelessly runs out in the street and is hit by a car. In the afterlife, he is told that he has done so many misdeeds in his life that his chances of getting into Heaven are slim, but he can get a second chance. Thus, he is sent back to Earth; now in the form of a young cat, but still able to remember his former life as a human boy.

The comic follows Billy as he struggles to deal with life as a cat, making many new friends (and a few enemies) among the many animals he meets - most importantly Mr. Hubert, a kind-hearted but blustery white alley cat who lives in a Cadillac in the junkyard, and who takes it upon himself to look after the new kitten - though very few of them (with the possible exception of Pirmin the circus bear) ever sincerely believe his claims that he used to be a human boy.

Compared to the cartoon series, the comic is slightly darker and more dramatic in spirit, with slightly grander adventures, bigger dangers and a more linear storyline, though it does remain largely comedic, with various eccentric characters and humorous dialogue.

History 
The character Billy first appeared in the magazine Spirou in 1982, with the story written by Stephen Desberg and illustrations by Stéphane Colman.

Animated series

References

Belgian comic strips
Humor comics
Child characters in comics
Fictional cats
Comics about cats
Dupuis titles
Works set in Wallonia
Fictional characters from Wallonia
Belgian comics characters
1981 comics debuts
Comics characters introduced in 1981
Comics adapted into animated series
Comics adapted into television series